DogsBlog.com is a UK dog rescue website founded by Ryan O'Meara and Kim Bruce, and set up by K9 Media Ltd. It was launched in January 2007, and has since found new homes for over 21,000 dogs via the website which provides a free service for 212 different rescue shelters.

Milestones and achievements
Ben, an 8 year old Shih Tzu, was the 2,000th dog rehomed via the website in May 2008. 3,000 dogs were resettled in new homes by November 2008 with a success rate of 75%; for every 100 dogs listed on the website, 75 were rehomed. Also during this period it had seen a big growth in web traffic, with a 334.98% increase in visitor traffic during the year.

The 4,000 milestone was announced on 14 March 2009 with both the 4,000th and 4,001st dogs, named Charlie and Millie, two German Shepherd cross Collie puppies. It was also announced at the same time that since its foundation, DogsBlog.com had relieved the animal welfare industry in the UK of more than £9,490,000 of financial strain.

The 6,000th dog adopted via the website was Ruby, an English Bull Terrier cross Staffordshire Bull Terrier in August 2009.

The website has worked with the national media in the United Kingdom to change the public opinion of dogs in rescue centres.

National dog adoption month
DogsBlog.com ran the UK's first National Dog Adoption Month in August 2008. Kim Bruce from DogsBlog.com said "The campaign aims to completely dispel the myth that rescue dogs need pity or sympathy or that dogs in shelters are somehow there due to problems in their makeup, physical or emotional." A 227% increase in dog adoptions was noted during the month.

Partner charities
DogsBlog.com is affiliated with more than 212 different partner charities and rescue organisations across the UK. Notable partners include Battersea Dogs and Cats Home, The Mayhew Animal Home, various Royal Society for the Prevention of Cruelty to Animals centres, The Blue Cross, Dogs Trust, and a wide range of local and breed specific rescue societies.

See also
Rescue group
Petfinder.org

References

External links
DogsBlog.com
Cute Pet Care

Dog organizations
2007 establishments in the United Kingdom
Animal welfare organisations based in the United Kingdom
Internet properties established in 2007
Pets in the United Kingdom
Pet websites